Alan Scott is a superhero appearing in American comic books published by DC Comics, and the first character to bear the name Green Lantern. He fights evil with the aid from his own mystical ring, which grants him a variety of powers. He was created by Martin Nodell and Bill Finger, first appearing in the comic book All-American Comics #16, published in 1940.

Alan Scott was created after Nodell became inspired by the characters from Greek, Norse, and Middle Eastern myths and tales, including Aladdin from One Thousand and One Nights, and sought to create a popular entertainment character who fought evil with the aid of a magic ring that grants him a variety of supernatural powers. After debuting in All-American Comics, Alan Scott soon became popular enough to sustain his own comic book, Green Lantern. Around this time DC also began experimenting with fictional crossovers between its characters, leading towards a shared universe of characters. As one of the publisher's most popular heroes, Alan became a founding member of the Justice Society of America, one of the first such teams of "mystery men" or superheroes in comic books.

Following World War II, the character's popularity began to fade along with the decline of the Golden Age of Comic Books, leading to cancellation. After eight years out of print, DC chose to reinvent Green Lantern as science fiction hero Hal Jordan in 1959. Later, DC revisited Alan Scott, establishing that Alan and Hal were Green Lanterns on two different parallel worlds, with Alan residing on Earth-Two and Hal on Earth-One. Later stories set on Earth-Two depicted Alan becoming the father to the superheroes Obsidian and Jade, each with powers somewhat like his own. In 1985, DC chose to reboot its internal continuity, merging Earth-One and Earth-Two and re-establishing Alan as an elder statesman of the DC Universe, coexisting with the more science fiction-oriented heroes of the Green Lantern Corps.

In 2011, DC's New 52 introduced a new Multiverse, depicting a young Earth-2 version of Alan who was an out gay man. The "original" version of Alan is brought back into the mainstream continuity following the 2016 DC Rebirth initiative, and in 2020, comes out to his children as gay, retroactively establishing this incarnation of Alan as the first gay superhero.

Publication history 
The original Green Lantern was created by an American artist named Martin Nodell. Nodell mentions Richard Wagner's opera cycle The Ring of the Nibelung and the sight of a trainman's green railway lantern as his inspiration. After seeing this opera, Nodell sought to create a superhero who wielded a variety of magical powers from a magic ring, which he regularly recharged from a green lantern. Nodell wanted a colorful and interesting costume for his character, deriving from elements of Greek mythology. As Nodell recalled in an undated, latter-day interview,

Nodell chose the name "Alan Scott" by flipping through New York telephone books until he got two names he liked.

The character of Alan Scott made his debut in All-American Comics #16 (July 1940), fighting crime under the masked identity of "Green Lantern". He also appeared as part of the superhero team Justice Society of America in All Star Comics #3 (Winter 1940). He served as the team's second chairman in #7, but departed following that issue and returned a few years later, remaining a regular character. His villains tended to be ordinary humans, but he did have a few paranormal ones, such as the immortal Vandal Savage and the zombie Solomon Grundy. Green Lantern proved popular and was given his own series, Green Lantern, later that year. Most of his adventures were set in New York.

In 1941, Alan Scott was paired with a sidekick named Doiby Dickles, a rotund Brooklyn taxi driver, who would appear on a regular basis until 1949. In 1948, Alan also got a canine sidekick named Streak. The dog proved so popular that he starred in his own solo side-stories.

After World War II, superheroes declined in popularity. Green Lantern was cancelled in 1949 after 38 issues and All-American Comics dropped superheroes in favor of westerns. Alan Scott's final Golden Age appearance was in All-Star Comics #57 (1951). He remained out of publication for 12 years, and even after his revival he never got another solo series.

In 1959, DC Comics editor Julius Schwartz reinvented Green Lantern as a science fiction hero. The new Green Lantern, named Hal Jordan, was empowered by alien masters to serve as an interstellar lawman and had many adventures set in outer space. His powers were similar to Alan's but he was otherwise completely unrelated—Alan Scott never existed as far as the new stories were concerned. Hal Jordan proved popular, but readers still had an interest in the old Green Lantern. Some years later, Alan Scott reappeared as a guest star in The Flash #137 (1963). To avoid continuity conflicts with the Hal Jordan character, Alan Scott and all his old stories were retconned as having existed on Earth-Two, in a parallel universe. For most of the 1960s and 1970s, Alan Scott made guest appearances in books belonging to Silver Age characters, visiting their universe through magical or technological means. In 1976, he appeared regularly alongside his Justice Society comrades in the revived All-Star Comics and later Adventure Comics in stories set in the 1970s. In 1981, DC Comics launched All-Star Squadron, which featured Alan Scott and the Justice Society in a World War II setting.

In 1986, the editors at DC Comics decided that all its characters should exist within the same setting and effected this change with the Crisis on Infinite Earths miniseries. Alan Scott now shared the same fictional world as Hal Jordan. DC Comics decided to write the character out of continuity in a one-shot book entitled Last Days of the Justice Society, in which he was "forever" trapped in an extra-dimensional realm. The character was brought back in the 1990s due to fan interest. Rather than update Alan Scott as a contemporary young hero as had been done with Batman and Superman, Alan Scott was instead written as a veteran of World War II with a magically prolonged lifespan. To distinguish Alan Scott from Hal Jordan, his superhero codename was for a time changed to "Sentinel" and he lost his magic ring, manifesting his powers through his glowing hands instead. In JSA #50 (2003) he regained his classic codename and ring, though he remained apart from Hal Jordan's Green Lantern Corps. He was a regular character in JSA and Justice Society of America.

In 2011, DC Comics again rebooted their fictional properties, and their new version of Alan Scott once again exists on Earth-2, where Hal Jordan and his Green Lantern Corps do not exist. The new Alan Scott is no longer a grizzled veteran of World War II, but a fresh young superhero. He first appears in Earth 2 #3 (2012) with a completely redesigned sleek, solid green suit with no cape.

Fictional character biography

Golden and Silver Ages

Discovery 

Thousands of years ago, a mystical "green flame" fell to Earth in ancient China as a meteor. A voice in the flame predicted that it would act three times: once to bring death, once to bring life, and once to bring power. For the first prophecy, a lamp-maker crafted the green metal of the meteor into a lamp. In fear and as punishment for what they thought sacrilege, the local villagers killed him, only to be destroyed by a sudden burst of the green flame. For the second, in modern times, the lamp came into the hands of a patient of a mental institution who fashioned the lamp into a modern train lantern. The green flame restored his sanity and gave him a new life. For the third, by 1940, after having already fulfilled the first two-thirds of this prophecy, the lantern fashioned from the meteoric metal fell into the hands of Alan Scott, a young railroad engineer. Following a railroad bridge collapse, the flame instructs Scott in how to fashion a ring from its metal, to give him fantastic powers as the superhero Green Lantern. He adopts a colorful costume of red, purple, brown, yellow, and green. He becomes a crimefighter in his first adventure, defeating the crooks who caused the accident. He also discovers his powers' weakness to wood when he is bludgeoned with a club. Alan is a founding member of the Justice Society of America, and is its second chairman.

Scott uses his ring to fly, walk through solid objects by "moving through the fourth dimension", paralyze or blind people temporarily, hypnotize them, create rays of energy, melt metal as with a blowtorch, and cause dangerous objects to glow, among other things. It could also allow him and others to time travel. Occasionally, he uses it to read minds or create solid objects and force fields in the manner usually associated with fellow Green Lantern, Hal Jordan. His ring could protect him against any object made of metal, but would not protect him against any wood- or plant-based objects.

During the 1940s, Green Lantern seemed to alternate between serious adventure, particularly when Solomon Grundy, his nemesis, appeared and light comedy, usually involving his sidekick, Doiby Dickles. Toward the end of his Golden Age adventures, he got a sidekick and companion pet in Streak the Wonder Dog – a heroic canine in the mold of Rin-Tin-Tin and Lassie – who was later retconned as a member of the Space Canine Patrol Agents, and the Legion of Super-Pets.

In All-American Comics #38, it's revealed his middle name is Wellington.

Justice Society of America 

A part of Scott's early history is filled out with retroactive continuity. All-Star Squadron Annual #3 states that the JSA fought the villain Ian Karkull, who inadvertently imbued them with life energy stolen from an innocent victim. The energy slowed their aging, allowing Scott and several other members, as well as their spouses, to remain active into the late 20th century without infirmity. The events of that incident also led Scott, who had failed to save the victim from whom the energy was stolen, to take a leave of absence from the JSA, explaining why the character vanished from the roster for a time.

Scott was a member of the Justice Society of America in 1951 when the team was investigated by the "Joint Congressional Un-American Activities Committee," a fictional organization based on the real-life House Un-American Activities Committee. They were accused of possible communist sympathies and asked to reveal their identities. The members declined the request, and many of the members retired in the 1950s.

The team rebands in the 1960s with Scott as a member, though little is known of their adventures during this time, save for stories about their team-ups with the Justice League of America, the parallel world Earth-One, and cross-universe adventures Scott shares with Earth-One's Green Lantern, Hal Jordan.

Progeny 
It was eventually revealed that in the late 1960s that Scott marries the woman with the dual identity Rose and Thorn. They have a pair of children who would grow up to become the superheroes Jade and Obsidian of the team Infinity, Inc.

In the 1980s, Scott married his reformed former nemesis, Molly Mayne, also known as The Harlequin, reconciling with his son and daughter.

Post-Crisis on Infinite Earths 
The Last Days of the Justice Society of America Special (1986) one-shot tells how Adolf Hitler caused a massive wave of destructive energy to erupt over the post-Crisis Earth in 1945. Scott and the JSA, fresh from burying their Earth-Two comrades Robin and Huntress, enter into a limbo dimension in order to fight an eternally recurring Ragnarok.

Green Lantern (vol. 3) #19 attempted to retcon Alan Scott's origin and power ring to accommodate the changes made by Crisis on Infinite Earths. In this story, Alan's ring originally belonged to a Green Lantern named Yalan Gur, who was so favored by the Guardians of the Universe that they removed the yellow impurity from his ring (which the Guardians deliberately placed in all the GL rings to limit their power and could be removed at their discretion). However, Yalan Gur abused his power and interfered with the inhabitants of ancient China. The Guardians then substituted a weakness for wood that allowed the local peasants to successfully attack and mortally wound Yalan with simple wooden clubs. Yalan flew into the sky and raged against the Guardians. His body burned in the atmosphere, becoming the green metallic meteorite that ultimately became Alan Scott's lantern. Yalan's spirit also possessed the metal, promising death in his rage and life when he realized his mistakes (the first two prophecies of the green metal, which were fulfilled). When Alan received the lantern, the spirit directed Alan to create the power ring and persona of Green Lantern, complete with the ring's weakness to wood.

Return 

Through the machinations of Waverider, the JSA teammates are able to leave Limbo and begin living in the Post-Crisis Earth they had fought to save. The miniseries is followed by Justice Society of America (1992–1993), which shows how Alan Scott adjusts to his new world. In the short-lived series, the JSA fight the newest incarnation of the Ultra-Humanite as well as Pol St. Germain and Kulak the Sorcerer. Scott reconnects with his wife and children, stating in issue #1 that Molly "is pretty much handling things at the company..." and that Jade and Obsidian "... are fine off doing their own thing in Hollywood. Not too interested in being super-heroes." The series ends with issue #10, not with the team disbanding, but with the members gathering together at their first formal meeting after returning home.

Alan follows Guy Gardner and a small group of heroes to investigate a mysterious distress from Oa, only to be defeated by Hal Jordan, who now calls himself Parallax, having been driven mad after the destruction of his home, Coast City. After the confrontation, Alan discovers that an artist, Kyle Rayner, inherits the remaining Green Lantern ring. After meeting the young hero, he informs him of the situations with Jordan and the Green Lantern Corps. During the Zero Hour event, Alan witnesses the villain Extant incapacitate and kill several of his JSA teammates. After suffering defeat by the villain, Alan gives Kyle his original ring, passing the name "Green Lantern" to him. Alan's ring was later destroyed by Parallax.

For a time, the Starheart became part of Scott's body and he adopts the name Sentinel, becoming a founding member of a new JSA. Thanks to the rejuvenative properties of the Starheart, Scott's physical body is again temporarily revitalized so that he resembles a man in his 30s or early 40s. This drives his wife Molly, who has not been affected, to sell her soul to the demon Neron in exchange for youth. Alan enters the demonic realm, with help from entities such as the Phantom Stranger and Zatanna, and, with Kyle Rayner's aid, manages to win Molly's soul back, reuniting Molly's essence with her soulless being.

He has since been physically altered again so that he more closely resembles his true chronological age. He returns to using the name "Green Lantern" during the JSA's battle with Mordru. He continues to fight crime in his original costumed identity, rebuilding a ring and serving as an elder statesman to the Justice Society of America and to the superhero community in general.

In Green Lantern: Rebirth, Alan and his daughter Jade, assist the surviving members of the Green Lantern Corps, Hal Jordan, who had been possessed by the ancient fear entity Parallax, John Stewart, Guy Gardner, Kyle Rayner, and Kilowog, in defeating the Parallax-possessed Ganthet. Alan is increasingly physically weakened due to Parallax's failed attempts to control him as it did with Jordan, Stewart, Gardner, and Kilowog, so it decides to kill him instead. However, Jordan, with the aid of The Spectre, breaks free from Parallax' influence, and saves Alan from the fear entity.

During the Rann-Thanagar War, Kyle Rayner's power ring revealed that Scott is an honorary member of the Green Lantern Corps.

Infinite Crisis and 52 
During the Infinite Crisis, Scott and his daughter Jade, along with many others, travel with Donna Troy to the center of the universe to save it from Alexander Luthor, Jr. Though they manage to succeed in saving the universe, Jade dies on this mission. A year later, Scott is still active and relatively youthful compared to his true age, but now wears an eyepatch having lost his eye in a Zeta beam transporter accident while returning from space. Though Scott loses his daughter, he tells Kyle Rayner that he still has family both through relations and close friendships, among which he counts Kyle.

Week 4 of the 52 maxiseries reveals that Scott lost his left eye during a period when he and several other superheroes were declared missing approximately 11 months prior to the events of Checkmate #1. The Zeta Beam that Adam Strange had hoped to use for teleporting the heroes away from the time-space ripple caused by Alexander Luthor, Jr.'s actions was splintered by the ripple itself, mutilating the heroes in various ways.

In Week 5, Alan goes to the wife and daughter of Animal Man to tell them that Animal Man is missing in space. This gives Ellen Baker more hope that her husband is alive.

In Week 29, Alan, Wildcat, and Jay Garrick (Flash) are the only members of the JSA present on Thanksgiving. They talk about the other members of the JSA and about the new Infinity Inc., which is a new version of a team of which Alan's daughter, Jade, was a member.

After being put into a comatose state during an attack by the Gentleman Ghost, Alan envisions Jade, who tells him goodbye and grants him another portion of her green energy. His missing eye is replaced by a green glowing orb that, due to its mystical origins and connection to Jade, allows him to track astral and mystical energy forms such as ghosts.

"One Year Later"
During the missing year of the "One Year Later" storyline, Scott has joined Checkmate at the rank of White King, with his JSA teammate Mister Terrific as his Bishop. Scott soon finds himself in a moral conflict with Black Queen Sasha Bordeaux over the violent nature of Checkmate, particularly after Bordeaux and her team slaughter dozens of Kobra operatives during a raid on a facility. Bordeaux contends that the ends justify the means, while Scott adheres to the principle that heroes should not kill unless absolutely necessary. Bordeaux responds by suggesting that Scott resign. Concurrent with this internal conflict, Scott and the White Queen (Amanda Waller) try to keep the organization from being discontinued by political forces.

After the rise of the being Gog, Alan Scott allies with the Justice Society members that oppose Gog's simplistic view of the world. However, after encountering a Justice Society from an alternate universe in which his daughter Jade is still alive, he considers asking the seemingly all powerful being to raise his daughter from the dead. Later, Sandman learns that Gog is rooting himself into the Earth, and if he remains for one more day, the Earth will no longer be able to survive without him. The rest of the JSA arrive to kill Gog by separating his head from the Earth, which is the only way to save the planet. The Society members ally with Gog in an attempt to protect him until they see him attempt to attack a Society member. All of Gog's followers, including Magog, turn on him, causing Gog's blessing on them to be undone. The JSA are able to topple Gog and send him to the Source Wall, but Alan is unable to see his daughter.

In the "Final Crisis" storyline, Alan led a resistance against Darkseid's forces as one of the superheroes responding to Article X. He is shown defending Checkmate's Switzerland HQ from the Justifiers. Though Donna Troy tries to place the Justifier helmet on him, Hawkman saves him.

In the "Blackest Night" storyline, Alan and the rest of the JSA battle the reanimated Kal-L and Black Lantern versions of dead Justice Society members. After Jakeem Thunder is knocked out, Alan is one of the heroes who adds his powers into a "Black Lantern Bomb" designed to mimic Jakeem's Thunderbolt abilities, destroying all of the Black Lanterns in New York. In the final battle of the event, his daughter Jade is resurrected by the power of white light.

"Brightest Day" 
In the beginning of the "Brightest Day" storyline, Alan lies in the arms of Obsidian, convulsing and writhing as a green light pours from his body. His body possessed, Alan flies off with his JSA teammates in hot pursuit, eventually led the team to Germany. The JSA meet up with Batman's new Justice League and find that Jade, who had been staying on Oa since her resurrection, has returned to Earth inside a green meteor, later revealed to be the legendary Starheart that gave Alan his powers. Sebastian Faust tells the two teams that the Starheart has been gradually taking control of people on Earth for quite some time. Now that it is on Earth, it is growing more powerful and driving metahumans all over the world insane. Jade states that the Starheart captured her in space and purposely brought her to Earth to find Alan and that it is her fault that her father is now in danger. Just then, Alan awakens and his costume transforms into a suit of armor identical to the one he wears in Kingdom Come, and he then tells the assembled heroes that he intends on destroying the world.

Starman is sent into space to search for Alan, and finds that Alan has constructed a massive fortress on the surface of the moon. Before Starman can warn the others, Alan appears in front of him and tears his gem, the source of his abilities, from his chest, thus rendering him powerless. The Starheart uses its influence to corrupt various metahumans with magical or elemental abilities, which creates chaos across the globe. Realizing that the heroes must defeat Alan in order to end the chaos, Batman recruits Miss Martian to get a mental lock on Starman, which, in turn, provides the Justice League with Alan's location. Batman then assembles a small strikeforce consisting of himself, Jade, Hourman, Donna Troy, Jesse Quick, and Mr. America, all of whom have a low chance of being possessed by the Starheart. Mister Miracle arrives and informs the team that Alan has most likely installed Fourth World defenses in his base and offers to use his knowledge of such technology to guide them through the fortress. When they finally find him, Jade uses her powers to restore Alan to normal. With his sanity restored, Alan chooses to allow the Emerald City he created on the moon to stay and the city becomes populated by various magical creatures from throughout the DCU.

After the events of the "Brightest Day", Alan and the rest of the JSA travel to the city of Monument Point, which has been attacked by a superpowered terrorist named Scythe. Just before being defeated, Scythe snaps Alan's neck. In the subsequent story, it is revealed that Scythe is the product of Nazi genetic engineering, and that Alan and Jay had been tasked by the president with killing the experiment back when he was in infancy during World War 2. The two heroes could not agree on a course of action, and, as a result, Scythe was allowed to live. Doctor Mid-Nite discovers that the injuries Alan sustained have rendered him paralyzed, and that any attempt to heal himself could break his constant concentration, which could result in the Starheart once again regaining control of his body.

Jade visits her bed-ridden father in the Emerald City, and offers to use her abilities to help him walk again. Alan declines his daughter's offer, reasoning that if the Starheart were to once again take over his body, it could result in the deaths of everyone in the city. Eclipso attacks the city, which results in Jesse Quick having to get Alan to safety. After taking over Jade, Eclipso has the power of the starheart then defeats and possesses the Justice League's reserve roster, and then badly injures the angel Zauriel. With the Justice League outnumbered, Eclipso then reveals his ultimate goal is to somehow kill God. Eclipso then tortures Zauriel, causing his screams to attract the attention of the new Spectre, Crispus Allen, who he kills, absorbing the Spectre's powers upon his demise. With his newfound abilities, Eclipso reveals that God relies on the collective love of humanity in order to stay alive, and that by destroying the Earth, Eclipso will ultimately kill God once and for all. Just as the members of the JLA prepare to wage a counterattack, Eclipso destroys the moon, apparently dooming all life on Earth. With the moon destroyed, Eclipso then seemingly kills Donna Troy, the physically strongest remaining member of the Justice League. However, it is ultimately revealed that Donna's death was an illusion conjured by Saint Walker, who used his blue power ring to temporarily trap Eclipso in a state of euphoria. After the Atom and Starman break Eclipso's link to his brainwashed slaves, the combined heroes attack Eclipso together, defeating him. In the aftermath it is discovered that Jade and Obsidian can now be within proximity of each other again and their father has control of the Starheart again.

Later, the JSA try to take down the villain D'arken who has broken free from imprisonment beneath Monument Point and absorbed the powers of JSA members, but D'arken is too powerful. Due to this only non-superpowered and magical members fight D'arken. The JSA tells Alan that unleashing the Starheart is the only way to destroy D'arken. However, after releasing the Starheart energies, Alan's body begins to incinerate. Afterwards, the JSA attend a funeral for Alan, whom they believe to be dead.

DC Universe 
In the 2017 - 2019 Watchmen sequel Doomsday Clock, Johnny Thunder finds Alan Scott's Green Lantern power battery in a steel mill. After he and Saturn Girl save Johnny Thunder from some junkies, Rorschach (Reggie Long) asks Johnny Thunder what that lantern is. Later, Doctor Manhattan recalls various events in which he indirectly killed Alan Scott and thus set forth changes in the timeline. On July 16 of 1940, Alan Scott was riding on a train over a collapsing bridge, but he survived by grabbing onto the lantern. He continues his life, eventually "sitting at a round table wearing a mask" and later testifying before the House Un-American Activities Committee but refusing to implicate anyone in his employ. On July 16 of 1940 again, Doctor Manhattan moves the lantern six inches out of Alan Scott's reach so that Scott dies in the train accident and leaves no family behind, as the green lantern is passed through different locations thereafter. When Lois Lane finds a flash-drive among the mess while at the Daily Planet, it shows her footage of Alan Scott and the rest of the Justice Society. It is revealed that Doctor Manhattan prevented Scott from becoming Green Lantern and indirectly killed him because he was curious about what the effects of changing the history of the Metaverse would have on not just itself but on Superman. As a result of Alan Scott not becoming the Green Lantern, the Justice Society of America was never formed and history was reset into the New 52 Universe/Prime-Earth. In the present time during a confrontation among different factions, Doctor Manhattan becomes inspired by Superman, so he undoes the changes that he made to the timeline by moving the lantern back on July 16 of 1940, which resulted in the restoration of the timeline and therefore the return of Alan Scott alongside many other superheroes to the DC Universe. Because of this, Alan Scott and the Justice Society assisted Superman and the Legion of Super-Heroes in fighting Black Adam's group as well as the People's Heroes from Russia, the Outsiders from Markovia, and the Doomed from India.

In the pages of Dark Nights: Death Metal, Alan Scott was seen with Jay Garrick, Doctor Fate, and Wildcat where they guarded the Valhalla Cemetery. When Wonder Woman, Wally West, and Swamp Thing enter, Alan Scott unleashes a Cerberus construct on them as he asks for the password. Wonder Woman states that the last person who told her it stated "Munkel." Alan Scott calls off the construct and stated that she was close as the password was "Ma Hunkel." Alan Scott was the with the Justice Society when the good guys and bad guys were preparing for the final battle against Perpetua and Darkest Knight.

Following the reboot of the multiverse at the end of Death Metal, Alan Scott and other Golden Age heroes are restored to the timeline. In Infinite Frontier #0 Alan reunites with Jade and Obsidian at the Justice Society brownstone and comes out as gay. He is invited to join the Totality, a team of superheroes and villains dedicated to protecting Earth from any threats in the new multiverse, returning to the moniker of Sentinel.

In the pages of "The New Golden Age" one-shot, a flashback to 1940 had Green Lantern among the Justice Society members about to get a group photo taken by Johnny Thunder when Doctor Fate has a vision about "lost children". The issue also reveals that Green Lantern has a Russian counterpart in Red Lantern who he fought on occasion and had a truce with when Nazis threatened both North America and Russia. This bio was also tied in to another flashback to the 1940s where Alan Scott and Doiby Dickles were reading a newspaper about Red Lantern burning a navy ship that left a dozen people dead. On October 31, 1950, Green Lantern was among the Justice Society members who appeared before a Congressional committee. When a Huntress from a possible future ends up in 1940, Green Lantern is among the Justice Society members that meet her. As Doctor Fate tries to read Huntress' mind about the threat in her future, Green Lantern is among those that are knocked down by the magical feedback.

Powers, abilities, and equipment 
Alan Scott originally wields an ancient ring that can produce a variety of effects. The extent of his ring's ability has never been rigorously defined, but its effects are accompanied by a green light and cannot directly affect wooden materials.

In Scott's first appearance, his body would glow green whenever he utilized this power, including passing through walls or flying. During his later appearances, he projects a greenish laser beam from his ring capable of doing many things, such as lifting objects, manipulating metals, hypnotizing people, traveling through spacetime, or rewriting reality itself. This ring makes him invulnerable to non-wooden weapons. He conjures up solid-light objects in any size or shape, plus referring them to as "constructs". These constructs were always pure green in color and vanishes as soon as he stops concentrating on them. Scott could control the objects telekinetically.

At the start of numerous stories, he charges his ring by touching it to a Starheart Lantern, which will give him full energy for 24 hours (until how heavily it runs out).

In the Starheart storyline, his constructs were now wreathed in green flames, thus highlighting their magical (but not technological) nature. He physically merged with his lantern and no longer needs to recharge like Hal Jordan does.

After battling Ian Karkull, a unique form of radiation from the Shadowlands he was bathed in granted him eternal youth.   

Before he became a superhero, Scott possesses expertise in acting, business intuition, driving, electrical engineering, journalism, martial arts, and mechanics.

Other versions

Earth 2

Alan was reintroduced in issue 1 of Earth 2 as the young dynamic head of GBC productions on Earth 2 (a parallel world within the DC Multiverse). This version of Green Lantern is associated with the Green, a mystical realm/entity that connects all botanical life on Earth. On June 1, 2012, DC announced that Scott would be reimagined as a gay man. In issue 3, Scott is revealed to have a boyfriend named Sam Zhao, to whom he intends to propose while on vacation in China. Before he can do so the train on which the couple is traveling is suddenly wrecked. A mysterious green flame protects Scott and heals him; a disembodied voice informs him that the crash was caused by a force that threatens the whole world, and that Sam did not survive. The grief-stricken Scott is then told that he will be given the power to avenge his love and protect the world. The flame creates a costume for him, and molds Sam's engagement ring into a power ring with which Scott can harness his power. Reborn as the Green Lantern, Scott proceeds to help the other survivors and swears vengeance for Sam. In the present, he gains an enemy in Solomon Grundy who is an avatar of the Grey. Green Lantern is assisted by Flash and Hawkgirl in fighting him, but Atom brings him down temporarily by jumping onto him at giant size. The battle continues until Scott once again exiles Grundy to the moon where neither he nor the "Grey" can do any damage.

Alan was later reunited with Sam who has become an avatar for the White. Following their brief fight with Solomon Grundy, the Parliaments ended their feud where they instructed Alan, Sam, Grundy, the Clear's avatar Azathoth, and the Red's Yolanda Montez to work together to combat the invasion from Apokolips.

When Apokolips starts to approach Earth 2, the Parliaments advise their representatives to join forces and fight this threat. While in Earth's orbit, Solomon Grundy, Azathoth, and Sam Zhao sacrifice their lives so that Alan Scott can receive their combined Parliament abilities to stop Apokolips from destroying Earth 2. Alan didn't know it yet, but Sam's spirit was still with him. Following a disastrous fight with Darkseid, Alan woke up to see Sam's spirit who revealed that he was chosen to be the Avatar of the White while assisting the Parliaments way to ease Alan's transition into realizing his full potential as the last champion of Earth and to embody its primordial essences at the cost of losing his memories of Sam.

Kingdom Come

In the Kingdom Come limited series by Mark Waid and Alex Ross, Alan is the only Green Lantern on Earth. He lives in an orbital space station called New Oa from which he protects Earth from alien attacks, and has ceased to meddle in human affairs. When Superman comes out of retirement, he joins the Justice League to help suppress the rogue superhumans that are causing chaos throughout the world. After the crisis is resolved, he joins the United Nations as the ambassador of the sovereign nation of New Oa.

Alan Scott's costume in this series was styled after the full plate armor of medieval knights. In the regular books, he has sported this armor on several occasions when he uses high amounts of power.

JSA: The Unholy Three

Another version of Alan Scott was seen briefly in JSA: The Unholy Three as a post-WW2 agent called the Lantern whose use of his power ring was invaluable to the intelligence community for its ability to discern truth from lies. The ring and Alan's hand were destroyed by a Superman gone rogue.

Green Lantern: Evil's Might
In the Elseworlds tale, Green Lantern: Evil's Might, Alan Scott is depicted as the young leader of a gang called the Bowery Greens. He steals a magical green gem similar to Kyle Rayner's ring and later steals Kyle's lantern. In a final showdown, he fatally wounds Kyle, but is absorbed into Kyle's ring.

The Golden Age

In the Elseworlds series "The Golden Age", Alan Scott finds himself under investigation from the House Un-American Activities Committee because of his refusal to turn over employees suspected of communist activities. In the final battle with Dynaman, Johnny Quick refers to him as "the big guy", implying that he may have been the most powerful hero of the era (although this is likely also a reference to Alan's large physical stature).

Superman & Batman: Generations 2
In Superman & Batman: Generations 2, an alternate version of Alan Scott is featured. This Alan Scott's ring's origin is explained as having originally been a Green Lantern ring that was lost on Earth long ago. In this storyline, the first time Alan used his ring, he was knocked out from behind by a man with a wooden club. This caused Alan to believe the ring was weak against wood, thereby causing a mental block that prevented him from truly exerting his power against wooden objects or attacks. This was confirmed by the Guardians, who explained that this was the reason behind the weakness to yellow of the Green Lantern Corps' rings. They simply told all new Green Lanterns that their rings were powerless against yellow to establish the same mental block.

52
In the final issue of the 2006 - 07 miniseries 52, a new Multiverse is revealed, originally consisting of 52 identical realities. Among the parallel realities shown is one designated "Earth-2". As a result of Mister Mind "eating" aspects of this reality, it takes on visual aspects similar to the pre-Crisis Earth-Two, including the Green Lantern among other Justice Society of America characters. The names of the characters and the team are not mentioned in the panel in which they appear, but the Green Lantern is visually similar to Alan Scott.

Based on comments by writer Grant Morrison, this alternate universe is not the pre-Crisis Earth-Two.

It was revealed in Justice Society (vol. 3) #20 that the post-Crisis Earth-2 Alan Scott is dead as stated by his daughter Jade who encountered the New Earth Scott and was shocked to see the New Earth counterpart to her father still alive.

Superman: Red Son
In the 2003 miniseries Superman: Red Son, Scott is also shown as a member of the Green Lantern Marine Corps.

A Brave New World
A Brave New World, a story published in Wonder Woman #750 details how Wonder Woman, the world's first superhero, revealed herself at the 1939 World's Fair, rescuing President Franklin D. Roosevelt from an assassination attempt. The narrator reflects that Wonder Woman's faith in humanity inspired people and provided hope in a dark time. In the final panel, the narrator is revealed to be Alan Scott, wearing his power ring. This was intended to be the first story set in the "5G" continuity, a reboot of the DC Universe which was eventually cancelled, making it a standalone non-canon story.

In other media

Television
 A character based on Alan Scott called Scott Mason / Green Guardsman appears in the Justice League two-part episode "Legends", voiced by William Katt. The Green Guardsman was a superhero from an alternate reality and member of the Justice Guild of America who wields a power ring similar to those used by the Green Lantern Corps, though he cannot affect aluminum, and was viewed by the residents of the "mainstream" Earth as a fictional character.
 Alan Scott appears in the Smallville two-part episode "Absolute Justice", portrayed by Doug Pinton. This version operated as a superhero and served as the CEO of an unnamed broadcasting company in the 1970s before he was arrested for fraud by the government, who were on a mission to take down the Justice Society of America (JSA). Scott, like the other members of the team, tried to take the blame for several crimes, though they were never convicted. As the law was now aware of his superhero identity, Scott retired from heroics. His ring and battery were later stored in the museum that the JSA used as their lair. In the television series' comic book continuation Smallville Season 11, it is revealed that Scott was not a member of the Green Lantern Corps and got his power ring and battery through unknown means.
 Alan Scott appears in the Batman: The Brave and the Bold episode "Crisis: 22,300 Miles Above Earth!", voiced by Corey Burton. This version is a member of an aged Justice Society of America.
 Alan Scott makes a non-speaking cameo appearance in the Young Justice episode "Humanity" as a member of the Justice Society of America.
 Alan Scott appears in the DC Universe / The CW series Stargirl, portrayed by an uncredited actor. This version is a member of the Justice Society of America before the team was attacked and killed by the Injustice Society. While his ring disappeared, Courtney Whitmore claims his powerless battery in the present in the hopes of finding someone to succeed him. Scott's daughter, Jade (portrayed by Ysa Penarejo), and ring later appear in season two.

Film
Alan Scott makes a cameo appearance in the opening credits of Justice League: The New Frontier, wherein he is forced out of heroics by the government.

Video games
Alan Scott appears in DC Universe Online, voiced by Jason Phelps.

Miscellaneous
 Alan Scott appears in a volume of the Sleepers trilogy, created by Mike Baron and written by Christopher J. Priest.
 Alan Scott appears in Adventures in the DC Universe #4.
 Alan Scott makes a cameo appearance in Justice League Adventures #20.
 Alan Scott appears in Justice League Unlimited #40.

Action figures
In 2010, a figure of Alan Scott was released in Wave 14 of Mattel's DC Universe Classics toyline.

Collected editions
 Golden Age Green Lantern Archives Vol. 1 (Green Lantern Vol. 1 #1 and All-American Comics #16–30)
 Golden Age Green Lantern Archives Vol. 2 (Green Lantern Vol. 1 #2–3 and All-American Comics #31–38)
 JSA Presents: Green Lantern (Green Lantern: Brightest Day, Blackest Night (one-shot); JSA: Classified #25, #32–33)
 Crisis on Multiple Earths: The Team-Ups Vol. 1 (Green Lantern Vol. 2 #40)
 Crisis on Multiple Earths: The Team-Ups Vol. 2 (Green Lantern Vol. 2 #45, 52)

References

External links
Alan Scott at Comic Vine

All-American Publications characters
Characters created by Bill Finger
Comics characters introduced in 1940
DC Comics characters who have mental powers
DC Comics characters who use magic
DC Comics LGBT superheroes
DC Comics male superheroes
DC Comics metahumans
DC Comics telekinetics
Earth-Two 
Fictional actors
Fictional avatars
Fictional businesspeople
Fictional characters displaced in time
Fictional characters who can manipulate light
Fictional characters who can manipulate reality
Fictional characters who can manipulate time
Fictional characters who can turn intangible
Fictional characters with density control abilities
Fictional characters with elemental and environmental abilities
Fictional characters with energy-manipulation abilities
Fictional characters with metal abilities
Fictional characters with slowed ageing
Fictional drivers
Fictional electrical engineers
Fictional gay males
Fictional hypnotists and indoctrinators
Fictional male martial artists
Fictional mechanics
Fictional reporters
Fictional writers
Golden Age superheroes
Green Lantern Corps officers
Mythology in DC Comics